"Long Live" is a song recorded by American country music duo Florida Georgia Line. It was released on September 10, 2020 as the second single from their fifth studio album Life Rolls On. It was written by the duo's members Tyler Hubbard and Brian Kelley, along with David Garcia, Corey Crowder and Josh Miller.

Content 
Rolling Stone commented that "'Long Live' is an ode to small-town Friday nights that recalls the duo’s early hits like 'Cruise' and 'Round Here.' 'Long Live' owns beefed-up drums, programmed beats, and a melodic guitar hook that snakes through the recording."

Music
Kelley explained to Billboard: "This song has a throwback, Here's to the Good Times vibe, kind of from our first record. It was a throwback, but kind of new and fresh, and it just feels like an anthem. It's easy to sing along to it. Ever since we wrote it, we couldn't stop singing it."

Charts

Weekly charts

Year-end charts

Certifications

References

2020 singles
2020 songs
Florida Georgia Line songs
Songs written by Corey Crowder (songwriter)
Songs written by David Garcia (musician)
Songs written by Tyler Hubbard
Songs written by Brian Kelley (musician)
Big Machine Records singles